Jesse Hazen Ames (May 25, 1875 – April 12, 1957) was an American football coach and college administrator. He served as the head football coach at the River Falls State Normal School—now known as the University of Wisconsin–River Falls—in 1909, compiling a record of 1–2. Ames was the chancellor at River Falls State, first on an interim basis in 1911 and then full-time from 1917 to 1949.

References

External links
 

1875 births
1957 deaths
Heads of universities and colleges in the United States
Wisconsin–River Falls Falcons football coaches
University of Wisconsin–Stevens Point alumni
People from Outagamie County, Wisconsin
Coaches of American football from Wisconsin